Nikolay Neklepayev (born 1888, date of death unknown) was a Russian athlete. He competed in the men's discus throw and the men's javelin throw at the 1912 Summer Olympics.

References

1888 births
Year of death missing
Athletes (track and field) at the 1912 Summer Olympics
Male discus throwers from the Russian Empire
Male javelin throwers from the Russian Empire
Olympic competitors for the Russian Empire
Place of birth missing